Miss United States is a pageant held in the United States for unmarried women between the ages of 20-29. The pageant includes women selected to represent all 50 states, District of Columbia, American Samoa, Guam, Commonwealth of the Northern Mariana Islands, Puerto Rico, and the U.S. Virgin Islands. 

The Miss United States pageant's mission is to "celebrate intelligent women of all walks of life." The Miss United States pageant includes the following competition segments: Private Interview (a 3 minute private interview with judges about the delegate's career, academic, and charitable accomplishments), Evening Gown (a runway walk in formalwear to demonstrate the delegate's poise), Swimsuit (a runway walk in swimwear to display the delegate's physical fitness and on-stage confidence), and Personal Platform Promise (a 60 second 'pitch' of the delegate's chosen charitable cause followed by an onstage question). All four competition segments are worth 25% of the delegate's overall score. 

Miss United States is part of the pageant system known as Mrs. United States Pageant, Inc. (DBA United States National Pageants) which has eight divisions: Little Miss United States, Miss Pre-Teen United States, Miss Jr. Teen United States, Miss Teen United States, Miss United States, Ms. United States, Ms. Woman United States, and Mrs. United States. United States National Pageants is the official and exclusive owner of the "Miss United States" trademark. In 2016, Miss United States organizers held the national pageant in Las Vegas, where it initially was held, for a 30th anniversary celebration.

The reigning Miss United States is Lily K. Donaldson of Memphis, Tennessee, who was crowned on October 17, 2022 in Memphis, Tennessee.

Notable past Miss United States titleholders include Miss United States 2013 Candiace Dillard, who is a reality television personality on Bravo's Real Housewives of Potomac, and Miss United States 2014 Elizabeth Safrit, who also represented the United States at Miss World 2014 in London, England on December 14, 2014 where she placed as 2nd runner-up and earned the title of Continental Queen of Beauty of the Americas.

Titleholders 
This is a list of women who have won the Miss United States beauty pageant since 2001.

Recent placements and awards

2022

2021

2020

2019

In popular media 
In the 2000 American comedy film Miss Congeniality, the FBI asks tomboy agent Gracie (Sandra Bullock) to go under cover as a contestant when a terrorist threatens to bomb the Miss United States pageant. The film also popularized the pop-culture phrase "she's beauty and she's grace" from the Miss United States song which has lyrics "she's beauty and she's grace, she's Miss United States."

Gallery of Past Titleholders

References 

Beauty pageants in the United States
1937 establishments in the United States
American awards